Jón Dagur Þorsteinsson (born 26 November 1998) is an Icelandic professional footballer who plays as a winger for OH Leuven and the Iceland national team.

Club career
On 25 June 2019, Danish Superliga club AGF announced that they had signed Jón on a three-year contract. Jón left AGF at the end of the 2021–22 season.

International career
In October 2018 Jón was named in the Iceland national team's squad for matches against France and Switzerland.

Career statistics

Scores and results list Iceland's goal tally first, score column indicates score after each Jón Dagur goal.

References

External links

Living people
1998 births
Icelandic footballers
Icelandic expatriate footballers
Association football wingers
Iceland under-21 international footballers
Iceland international footballers
People from Kópavogur
Danish Superliga players
Handknattleiksfélag Kópavogs players
Fulham F.C. players
Vendsyssel FF players
Aarhus Gymnastikforening players
Oud-Heverlee Leuven players
Icelandic expatriate sportspeople in Belgium
Icelandic expatriate sportspeople in England
Icelandic expatriate sportspeople in Denmark
Expatriate footballers in Belgium
Expatriate footballers in England
Expatriate men's footballers in Denmark